The Federal Agency for Press and Mass Communications (FAPMC) (Rospechat) was a regulatory state agency within the hierarchy of the Russian Government.

The agency succeeded the former Ministry of Press, Broadcasting and Mass Communications (МПТР). It was transformed during a governmental reform in 2004, and subordinated to the Ministry of Digital Development, Communications and Mass Media, so it was no longer a standalone ministry. Since reorganization, it was headed by Mikhail Vadimovich Seslavinsky until its abolition in 2020.

Rospechat was a federal executive body responsible for providing government services, and managing government property in the field of press, mass media and mass communications, including public computer networks used in electronic media as well as in printing and publishing.

The Federal Agency for Press and Mass Communications executed the following functions:
rendering competitive government support to produce and/or distribute socially important media projects, to create and maintain social work and education-related websites
participating in development and organization of events to implement the government policy in the following spheres:
printed media, information sharing, distribution of printed periodicals, printed media development and support
book publishing and reading and book promotion, implementation of the National reading support and development programme events
TV and radio broadcasting, digital technologies implementation, development and renovation of the satellite, ground cable and aerial networks, media and information sharing development
analysing electronic media audience and printed media issues
compiling compulsory free copies of all printed publications
managing federal funds of produced and broadcast TV and radio programmes, shows, sound records and other audiovisual products (except movies)
performing economic analysis of the subordinate state unitary enterprises, approving their economic indicators, and verifying their financial and operating performance and property employment
acting as a governmental customer to obtain federal grants, research and development and innovation programmes and projects
organizing congresses, conferences, seminars, exhibitions and other events related to press, publishing and printing, and electronic media
monitoring printed media market, including its circulation, financial, advertising and other indicators
preparing and issuing an annual analytical report the "conditions, problems and development prospects" of Russian printed media
sponsoring electronic media from federal budget resources
supporting compatriots living abroad, as well as maintaining a common information space for the Russian-speaking population in Russia and the countries of the near abroad
implementing government policies regarding counter-terrorism and extremism operations, anti-drug abuse and trafficking activities
rendering information, technical, organizational and consulting support to legal bodies and individual entrepreneurs in terms of radio-frequency spectrum utilization for TV and radio broadcasting, information sharing, and public computer networks development
managing a voluntary certification system for the production of stamps and letterheads with the national emblem of the Russian Federation.

The Federal Agency for Press and Mass Communications cooperated with a series of broadcasters, publishers and other media market actors. It supported various national and international projects, including the annual Runet Prize, the Russian Internet Forum, the National Association of Television and Radio Broadcasters Congress, the Valdai International Discussion Club, the international multimedia festival "Vivid Word", the "Book of the Year" national contest, the Russian Publishing Expo Forum, and the national book festival "Red Square".

According to the Presidential Decree of the Russian Federation of November 20, 2020 No 719 "About enhancement of public administration in the sphere of digital development, communication and mass communications", the Federal Agency for Press and Mass Communications was abolished, and its functions were transferred to the Ministry of Digital Development, Communications and Mass Media of the Russian Federation.

See also
Communications in Russia
Federal Service for Supervision in the Sphere of Telecom, Information Technologies and Mass Communications (Roskomnadzor)

References

External links
 

Government agencies of Russia
Mass media in Russia
Regulation in Russia
Mass media regulation